The Thatcher Unified School District serves the town of Thatcher, Arizona. It includes Jack Daley Primary School (grades K–2), Thatcher Elementary School (grades 3–5), Thatcher Middle School (grades 6–8), and Thatcher High School. The middle, elementary, and primary schools are located 3 blocks up 2nd from Reay.

In 2009, Jack Daley Primary School was named a National Blue Ribbon School.

References

External links
 School district website

School districts in Graham County, Arizona